Beau Genius (foaled May 20, 1985 – July 25, 2014) was a Canadian Thoroughbred racehorse.

Background

Bred at Sovereign Farm by owners Joseph Shiewitz and Dr. Brian Davidson, he was sired by Bold Ruckus, one of the leading sires in Canada who was a grandson of the extremely important North American Champion sire, Bold Ruler. The dam of Beau Genius was Royal Colleen, a daughter of Northern Dancer's son, 1968 Canadian Horse of the Year, Viceregal.

Racing career

Conditioned for racing by Gerry Belanger, at age two Beau Genius began his racing career from a base at Woodbine Racetrack in Toronto. He won the 1987 Display Stakes, notably defeating third-place finisher Regal Intention and was second to Regal Intention in the Kingarvie Stakes. As a three-year-old, Beau Genius had his best result with a win in the important Autumn Handicap then at four, racing for new trainer Gerald Bennett, he won Florida's Okeechobee Handicap  and later at Thistledown Racecourse in Ohio, the Thistledown Breeders' Cup Sprint Handicap.

Competing at age five, Beau Genius had the best year of his racing career, winning on both fast and sloppy track surfaces. He won nine stakes races in 1990, beginning in January when Bill Shoemaker rode him to victory in the Hallandale Handicap at Gulfstream Park. The win was the last of the U.S. Racing Hall of Fame inductee's illustrious career as a jockey. Among his other 1990 wins, Beau Genius handily defeated Black Tie Affair to capture the Isaac Murphy Handicap at Arlington Park and beat Opening Verse in winning the Michigan Mile And One-Eighth Handicap and won the Grade I Philip H. Iselin Handicap at Monmouth Park for his 6th straight win!

Beau Genius made two more starts at age five, 3rd in the Meadowlands Cup then 10th in the Breeders Cup Classic then was retired to stud having won more than $1 million.

Stud career
Beau Genius was sent to stand at stud at Vinery, Inc. farm in Lexington, Kentucky. There, he notably sired Belle Genius who won the Group One Moyglare Stud Stakes at the Curragh in Ireland. He sired thirty-two stakes race winners and from 1999 he stood at Donald and Karen Cohn's Ballena Vista Farm  in Ramona, California. Beau Genius was euthanized on July 25, 2014.

References

 Beau Genius' pedigree and partial racing stats
 November 2004 California Thoroughbred article on Beau Genius (PDF)
 Beau Genius details at Ballena Vista Farm
 Video at YouTube of Beau Genius winning the 1990 Michigan Mile 
 Video at YouTube of Beau Genius winning the 1990 Churchill Downs Handicap

1985 racehorse births
2014 racehorse deaths
Racehorses bred in Ontario
Racehorses trained in Canada
Thoroughbred family 9-d